Frederick William Mansfield (March 26, 1877 – November 6, 1958) was an American politician and 46th mayor of Boston, Massachusetts.

Early life
Mansfield was born in East Boston, Massachusetts, March 26, 1877.  Mansfield was the son of Michael Read Mansfield and Catherine (McDonough) Mansfield.

Mansfield graduated from East Boston High School in 1894, and went on to Boston University School of Law, where he received a L.L.B. degree in 1902.

Mansfield served as an apothecary in the U.S. Navy on the USS Vulcan during the Spanish–American War.  After working as a pharmacist, Mansfield was admitted to the Massachusetts Bar in 1902; he worked as an attorney.

Political career
In 1913, Mansfield was elected treasurer and receiver general of the Commonwealth of Massachusetts serving from 1914 to 1915.  In 1914, he lost his bid for re-election to Charles L. Burrill. He was an unsuccessful candidate for Governor of Massachusetts in 1916 and 1917.

Mansfield ran for Mayor of Boston twice. He finished second to James Michael Curley in November 1929, then topped a field of six candidates in November 1933. He served as mayor from 1934 to 1938, and was not eligible to run for re-election, as Massachusetts law at the time did not allow the Mayor of Boston to serve consecutive terms.

Personal life
Mansfield married Helen Elizabeth Roe on June 29, 1904.  Mansfield's son, Walter Roe Mansfield, was born on July 1,  1911.

Death
Mansfield died in St. Elizabeth's Hospital, Boston, Massachusetts, November 6, 1958.  He was buried in Holyhood Cemetery in Brookline, Massachusetts.

See also
 Timeline of Boston, 1930s

References

Bibliography
 Hevesi, Dennis.: William R. Mansfield, Federal Judge is Dead at 75, New York Times (January 8, 1987).

1877 births
1958 deaths
People from East Boston, Boston
Boston University School of Law alumni
State treasurers of Massachusetts
Mayors of Boston
Catholics from Massachusetts